These are the official results of the Women's 3,000 metres event at the 1983 IAAF World Championships in Helsinki, Finland. There were a total number of 26 participating athletes, with two qualifying heats and the final held on Wednesday 1983-08-10.

The final was led from start to finish by Mary Decker-Slaney, a common tactic for her in the USA, but untested at the world level.  Marking her every move throughout the race was the Soviet pair of 1500 metres world record holder Tatyana Kazankina and 3000 metres world record holder Svetlana Ulmasova who expected to use their superior finishing speed.  As Decker gradually increased the pace, the field stretched out to a lead pack of five, with Wendy Smith-Sly and Agnese Possamai.  As the final lap approached, Sly, who ran in the USA frequently, moved to join Decker on her shoulder, while Brigitte Kraus covered the gap to join the lead pack.  The Decker/Sly wall kept the Soviet runners boxed in for half a lap, but when Kraus moved on the rail, Kazankina popped free and the race was on to the finish.  Coming off the final turn Kazankina looked ready to pass Decker, but she never got there as Decker found an extra gear to hold her off.  Kazankina eventually slowed before the finish to be passed by a fast closing Kraus two steps before the line.

Medalists

Records
Existing records at the start of the event.

Final

Qualifying heats
Held on Monday 1983-08-08

References
 Results

 
1983 in women's athletics